G. Narayan Reddy  (c. 1926 – 16 December 1998) was an Indian politician and Member of Parliament of India. He was a member of the 3rd Lok Sabha and represented the Adilabad constituency of Telangana. Reddy was a member of the Congress political party. He was murdered on 16 December 1998 at the age of 72.

Political career
Reddy was the third elected M.P from Adilabad constituency. This was his only term in the Lok Sabha of India.

Posts Held

See also

Andhra Pradesh Legislative Assembly
Lok Sabha
Parliament of India
Politics of India

References

India MPs 1962–1967
Indian National Congress politicians from Telangana
Lok Sabha members from Andhra Pradesh
People from Adilabad district
1920s births
1998 deaths
Indian National Congress politicians from Andhra Pradesh